Federal Communications Commission v. Pacifica Foundation, 438 U.S. 726 (1978), was a landmark decision of the US Supreme Court that defined the power of the Federal Communications Commission (FCC) over indecent material as applied to broadcasting.

Facts 
On October 30, 1973, FM radio station WBAI in New York City aired a broadcast that included a segment which featured the George Carlin routine "Filthy Words" as part of a program about societal attitudes toward language. A few weeks later, John Douglas (an active member of Morality in Media) stated in a complaint filed with the Federal Communications Commission (FCC) that he heard the broadcast while he was driving with his 15-year-old son. He also stated the material was inappropriate for the time of day (approximately 2:00 p.m.). In response, the Pacifica Foundation (owner of WBAI) received a letter of reprimand from the FCC, censuring them for allegedly violating broadcast regulations which prohibited airing indecent material.

Holding 
The U.S. Supreme Court upheld the FCC's actions in 1978, by a vote of 5 to 4, ruling that the routine was "indecent but not obscene". The Court recognized the government had strong interests in:
 Shielding children from potentially offensive material, and
 Ensuring that unwanted speech does not intrude on the privacy of one's home.

The Pacifica Court upheld the FCC's power to regulate broadcast media, citing two pervading governmental interests. First, the “uniquely pervasive” nature of these broadcasts allows them to seep into “the privacy of the home” without the consent of the viewer. Second, broadcasts are “uniquely accessible to children” whose “vocabulary [could be enlarged] in an instant” by hearing indecent or profane language. The Court held that these two concerns were sufficient to “justify special treatment of indecent broadcasting,” thereby allowing the FCC to fine broadcasters for airing inappropriate content.

The Court stated that the FCC had the authority to prohibit such broadcasts during hours when children were likely to be among the audience, and gave the FCC broad leeway to determine what constituted indecency in different contexts.

Impact 
At first, despite the resounding win in Pacifica, the FCC used its new regulatory powers sparingly. In the 1990s, however, the FCC ramped up sanctions for indecent broadcasts. By the early 2000s, the FCC began to levy more sanctions with higher dollar amounts—with fines of up to $500,000 for some offenses.

In 1997, Pacifica Radio "Living Room" host Larry Bensky prefaced an interview with Carlin by saying: "George Carlin, you're a very unusual guest for Pacifica Radio. You're probably the only person in the United States that we don't have to give The Carlin Warning to about which words you can't say on this program, because it's named after you."

In 1996, Congress passed the Communications Decency Act, which criminalized the knowing transmission of "obscene or indecent" messages to underage people on the Internet. In Reno v. American Civil Liberties Union (1997), the American Civil Liberties Union claimed that the act violated First Amendment's guarantee of freedom of speech for adult Internet users. To attain standing, the ACLU published the Supreme Court's opinion on F.C.C. v. Pacifica Foundation on its website, which included a transcript of Carlin's monologue.

See also

List of United States Supreme Court cases, volume 438
Federal Communications Commission v. Fox Television Stations (2009)
Federal Communications Commission v. Fox Television Stations (2012)
 Miller v. California 413 U.S. 15 (1973).

References

Further reading

External links 
 
 

Censorship of broadcasting in the United States
Obscenity law
Federal Communications Commission litigation
Pacifica Foundation
United States Supreme Court cases
United States Supreme Court cases of the Burger Court
United States Free Speech Clause case law
1978 in United States case law
Media case law
History of radio
1978 in radio
George Carlin